Manuel Menzel (born 29 September 1987) is a German footballer who plays as a defender for Kickers Emden.

Career
Menzel made his professional debut for Kickers Emden on 5 April 2009, coming on as a substitute in the 89th minute for Jan-André Sievers in the 1–2 away loss against SV Sandhausen.

References

External links
 Profile at DFB.de
 Profile at kicker.de
 Statistics at Fussball.de

1987 births
Living people
Footballers from Frankfurt
German footballers
Association football defenders
Kickers Emden players
3. Liga players